"The Blue Air Compressor" is a short story by Stephen King, first published in January 1971 in Onan.

Plot summary 
Gerald Nately is a young writer who writes a short story about his friend's wife, Mrs. Leighton (no first names for the couple are given).  Mrs. Leighton is an enormously obese woman, so Gerald calls his short story "The Hog."  Mrs. Leighton finds the story and mocks it, saying that she was too big for him to write about her, so he shoves the nozzle of an air compressor into her mouth and overinflates her, causing her to explode.  Her remains are buried under the tool shed, and Gerald flees to the Near East after retitling his story "the Blue Air Compressor."  Gerald's crime is never discovered, and eventually he cuts off his own head with a guillotine (after writing several dark and misunderstood novels, essays, short stories and poems).

Publication 
"The Blue Air Compressor" was first published in Onan, a literary magazine of the University of Maine at Orono, in January 1971, shortly after King had graduated. A "heavily revised" version was reprinted in the magazine Heavy Metal in July 1981. In 2018, it was collected for the first time in the anthology work "Shining in the Dark" edited by Hans-Åke Lilja. King stated that the story was partially inspired by an EC Comics story and by the works of Edgar Allan Poe.

Adaptions 
An audio adaption of "The Blue Air Compressor" (narrated by King himself) was released in 2020 as part of the audio adaption of "Shining in the Dark".

Reception 
Rocky Wood describes "The Blue Air Compressor" as "one of King's stranger stories, and far from his best" and as "not of high quality, pretentious...self-admittedly derivative and quite unrepresentative of King's style (even at the time it was written)". Stephen J. Spignesi describes it as "a strange, experimental story". George Beahm characterises it as "a one-note revenge tale". James Van Hise describes "The Blue Air Compressor" as "one very strange story". Michael R. Collings cites "The Blue Air Compressor" as an example of King's "vision [...] expanding, incorporating not only his own observations and interests but also tags of literary heritage as well."

See also 
 Stephen King short fiction bibliography

References

External links 
 "The Blue Air Compressor" at StephenKing.com

1971 short stories
Maine in fiction
Short stories by Stephen King
Works originally published in American magazines